Drummond is a town in Garfield County, Oklahoma, United States. The population was 455 at the 2010 census, up from 405 in 2000.

Geography
Drummond is located in southwestern Garfield County at  (36.300984, -98.035730).

Demographics

As of the census of 2020, there were 455 people, 139 households, and 103 families residing in the town. There were 166 housing units at an average density of 724.5 per square mile (278.7/km2). The racial makeup of the town was 91.60% White, 1.48% African American, 5.43% Native American, 0.25% Asian, 0.49% from other races, and 0.74% from two or more races. Hispanic or Latino of any race were 3.70% of the population.

There were 153 households, out of which 40.5% had children under the age of 18 living with them, 60.1% were married couples living together, 13.1% had a female householder with no husband present, and 20.9% were non-families. 18.3% of all households were made up of individuals, and 9.2% had someone living alone who was 65 years of age or older. The average household size was 2.65 and the average family size was 2.94.

In the town, the population was spread out, with 30.6% under the age of 18, 7.7% from 18 to 24, 29.6% from 25 to 44, 22.0% from 45 to 64, and 10.1% who were 65 years of age or older. The median age was 34 years. For every 100 females, there were 105.6 males. For every 100 females age 18 and over, there were 99.3 males.

The median income for a household in the town was $37,188, and the median income for a family was $45,313. Males had a median income of $28,594 versus $19,750 for females. The per capita income for the town was $14,733. About 8.5% of families and 13.8% of the population were below the poverty line, including 20.3% of those under age 18 and 10.0% of those age 65 or over.

Education
Its school district is Drummond Public Schools.

References

External links
 Encyclopedia of Oklahoma History and Culture - Drummond

Towns in Garfield County, Oklahoma
Towns in Oklahoma